{{Drugbox
| verifiedrevid = 464206335
| IUPAC_name = 4-methoxy-''N,N-bis(pyridin-3-ylmethyl)isophthalamide
| image = picotamide.png

| tradename =  
| Drugs.com = 
| pregnancy_AU = 
| pregnancy_US = 
| pregnancy_category =  
| legal_AU = 
| legal_CA = 
| legal_UK = 
| legal_US = 
| legal_status =  
| routes_of_administration =

| bioavailability =  
| protein_bound =  
| metabolism =  
| elimination_half-life =  
| excretion =

| CAS_number_Ref = 
| CAS_number = 32828-81-2
| CAS_supplemental =  (monohydrate) 
| ATC_prefix = B01
| ATC_suffix = AC03
| PubChem = 4814
| DrugBank_Ref = 
| DrugBank =  
| ChemSpiderID_Ref = 
| ChemSpiderID = 4649
| UNII_Ref = 
| UNII = 654G2VCI4Q

| C=21 | H=20 | N=4 | O=3 
| smiles = O=C(NCc1cccnc1)c3cc(C(=O)NCc2cccnc2)c(OC)cc3
| StdInChI_Ref = 
| StdInChI = 1S/C21H20N4O3/c1-28-19-7-6-17(20(26)24-13-15-4-2-8-22-11-15)10-18(19)21(27)25-14-16-5-3-9-23-12-16/h2-12H,13-14H2,1H3,(H,24,26)(H,25,27)
| StdInChIKey_Ref = 
| StdInChIKey = KYWCWBXGRWWINE-UHFFFAOYSA-N
}}Picotamide''' is a platelet aggregation inhibitor. It works as a thromboxane synthase inhibitor and a thromboxane receptor inhibitor, the latter by modifying cellular responses to activation of the thromboxane receptor. Picotamide is licensed in Italy for the treatment of clinical arterial thrombosis and peripheral artery disease.

References

External links
 Andrea Celestini and Francesco Violi: A review of picotamide in the reduction of cardiovascular events in diabetic patients (PubMed)

Antiplatelet drugs
3-Pyridyl compounds
Benzamides
Phenol ethers